"Voglio ballare con te" (English: "I want to dance with you") is a song recorded by Italian rapper Baby K, with vocals by Spanish singer Andrés Dvicio, for her upcoming third studio album. The song was released on 2 June 2017, through Sony Music Italy. It was produced by Takagi and Mr Ketra, who also produced the singer's smash-hit "Roma Bangkok".

Commercial performance
In Italy, "Voglio ballare con te" debuted at number 51, and later peaked at number 2. The song reached the triple platinum certification in that territory for selling over 150,000 copies. It also peaked at number 20 in Switzerland, marking Baby K's second entry and highest-charting song on the chart.

Spanish version
"Locos Valientes", the Spanish-language version of the song, was released on September 8, 2017. The song became Baby K's second Spanish song, following "Roma-Bangkok" featuring Giusy Ferreri or Lali.

Charts

Weekly charts

Year-end charts

Certifications

Release history

References

2017 singles
Italian songs
2017 songs
Male–female vocal duets
Sony Music singles